Sebastião Enio Santos de Almeida (born 3 March 2001), commonly known as Ênio, is a Brazilian footballer who plays for Belgian club RWDM on loan from Botafogo as a attacking midfielder.

Club career
On 25 August 2022, Ênio joined RWDM in Belgium on loan.

Career statistics

Club

Notes

Honours
Botafogo
 Campeonato Brasileiro Série B: 2021

References

2001 births
Living people
Brazilian footballers
Association football midfielders
Botafogo de Futebol e Regatas players
RWDM47 players
Campeonato Brasileiro Série A players
Campeonato Brasileiro Série B players
Brazilian expatriate footballers
Expatriate footballers in Belgium
Brazilian expatriate sportspeople in Belgium